The year 1690 in music involved some significant events.

Events
Invention of the clarinet (approximate)
Georg Muffat becomes Kapellmeister to the Bishop of Passau.

Published popular music
"Captain Johnson's Last Farewell"

Classical music
Giovanni Battista Bassani – Armonici entusiasmi di Davide, Op. 9 (Venice)
Giovanni Bononcini 
Chi d'Amor tra le catene
La Maddalena a'piedi di Cristo
Jacques Boyvin – Livre d'orgue I, Ton 1–8
Nicolaus Bruhns – Mein Herz ist Bereit
Dietrich Buxtehude  
Du Lebensfürst Herr Jesu Christ, BuxWV 22
Jubilate Domino, BuxWV 64
Quemadmodum desiderat cervus, BuxWV 92
Missa brevis, BuxWV 114
Marc-Antoine Charpentier  
Messe pour Mr Mauroy, H.6
Tenebrae Responsories H.127–133
Leçon de ténèbres du Mercredi saint, H.135, 138
Leçon de ténèbres du Jeudi saint, H.136, 139
Leçon de ténèbres du Vendredi saint, H.137, 140
In honorem Sancti Xaverij canticum, H.355
In nativitatem Domini canticum, H.416
Symphonie à 3 flûtes, H.529
Commencement d’ouverture, H.546
 François Couperin – La Steinquerque
 Gilles Jullien – Premier Livre d'Orgue
 Johann Kehnau – Bone Jesu, care Jesu
Georg Muffat – Apparatus Musico-Organisticus
Giovanni Domenico Partenio – Motets for two and three voices, Op. 1 (Venice: Giuseppe Sala)
Francesco Passarini – Misse brevi for eight voices and organ continuo, Op. 4 (Bologna: Pier Maria Monti)
Henry Purcell  
music for The Tempest
music for Amphitryon, Z.572
Giuseppe Torelli 
Trumpet Sonata in D major, G.1
Sinfonia in D major, G.2
Jean Veillot – Motets

Opera
Giuseppe Boniventi – 
Marc-Antoine Charpentier – 
Louis Lully – Orphée
Henry Purcell – Dioclesian, Z.627
Alessandro Scarlatti  
La Rosaura
La Statira

Theoretical writings
 Kurze doch deutliche Anleitung zu der lieblich- und löblichen Singekunst by Johann Georg Ahle, an enlarged and revised version of Johann Rudolf Ahle's famous singing manual, Brevis et perspicua introductio. A second edition was published in 1704.
Traité d’accompagnement pour le théorbe et le clavecin by Denis Delair

Births
February 1 – Francesco Maria Veracini, violinist and composer (died 1768)
June 11 – Giovanni Antonio Giay, composer (died 1764)
September 15 – Ignazio Prota, composer and music teacher (died 1748)
November 22 – François Colin de Blamont, composer (died 1760)
November 24 (baptized) – Charles Theodore Pachelbel, organist, harpsichordist and composer (died 1750)
date unknown 
Francesco Barsanti, composer, recorder & oboe virtuoso; born Lucca, Toscany (IT). (Died 1775)
Johann Tobias Krebs, organist and composer (died 1762)
probable
Giuseppe Antonio Brescianello, composer and violinist (died 1758)
Senesino, castrato singer (died 1756)

Deaths
May 27 – Giovanni Legrenzi, composer (born 1626)
July 10 – Domenico Gabrielli, cellist and composer (born c.1651)
date unknown – Gustaf Düben, organist (born 1628)

References

 
17th century in music
Music by year